ADT Inc., formerly The ADT Corporation, is an American company that provides residential, small and large business electronic security, fire protection, and other related alarm monitoring services throughout the United States. The corporate head office is located in Boca Raton, Florida. In February 2016, the company was acquired by Apollo Global Management for $6.9 billion in a leveraged buyout.

History
In 1863, Edward A. Calahan invented a stock ticker and formed the Gold and Stock Telegraph Company in 1867 to exploit the technology.  Gold and Stock also developed a messenger system that sent instructions to and from the stock exchange floor.   Three years later, the president of Gold and Stock Telegraph Company woke up to a burglar in his home, which inspired him to create a telegraph-based alert system.  This system eventually connected 50 of his neighbors to a central station where all the alert boxes were monitored. There were many small telegraph delivery companies in the United States in the 19th century.

In 1874, 57 district telegraph delivery companies affiliated and became American District Telegraph (ADT).  With the increase in telephone usage in the late 19th century, ADT's messenger business slowly declined in popularity.  ADT tried branching out and developing their signaling business, while still maintaining their telegraph business as primary income source.

ADT incorporated into Western Union in 1901 and separated its messenger business from its main signaling business at that time.  In 1909, Western Union and ADT came under the control of American Telephone & Telegraph Company (AT&T). ADT began to expand into new areas, such as fire alarms and security alarms between 1910 and 1930, but was kept separate from AT&T's Holmes alarm business. ADT became a publicly traded company in the 1960s.

In 1964, ADT was found to be a monopoly in restraint of trade.  It was shown to provide almost 80% of the central station alarm service in the United States.  In some cities, such as New York City and Memphis, Tennessee, they were the sole provider. They were also found to have forced competitors out of business by lowering prices below cost. They would charge national accounts very low prices in cities with competitors and much higher prices where no competition was available.  ADT was forced to adopt a national price list, which could not be varied, to help establish central station competitors in cities without competition, and to pay fines and triple damages to the federal government, customers, and local competitors.

In early 1987, the firm Hawley Goodall, owned by Lord Ashcroft, bought the Indianapolis-based Crime Control Inc., the fourth-largest company in the U.S. security market, for $50 million.  Later in the year, it bought ADT and moved to Bermuda. This purchase transformed Hawley into the leading security services business in the United States, and resulted in the majority of its revenues coming from the North American market. As a result of the acquisition, Hawley changed its name to ADT Limited and decided to refocus its business around security services. At the end of 1987, the company sold its North American–based facility services business to Denmark's ISS A/S.

In 1997, ADT was purchased by Tyco International in a reverse takeover.

Broadview Security acquisition

In January 2010, Tyco announced that it was acquiring Broadview Security (formerly Brinks Home Security) and was merging the company with its ADT division in a transaction valued at $2.0 billion.  In 2008, Brink's had spun out its home security business, which accounted for 15% of Brink's revenue that year, into a separate publicly traded company. Brinks Home Security had rebranded as Broadview Security in 2009 with a massive advertising campaign.  The ads were widely criticized as unscrupulous, fear-mongering, and  exaggerating what home security systems were capable of doing. Unflattering parodies of Broadview's TV commercials, mocking the company's attempts to manipulate consumers, were posted online, along with a filmed Saturday Night Live sketch featuring Andy Samberg and Bill Hader. The acquisition of Broadview closed in mid-2010, and combined the #1 and #2 security companies in North America, adding Broadview's 1.3 million customer accounts and $565 million in annual recurring revenue to ADT's existing customer base of 7.4 million accounts and $3 billion in annual revenue.

Other acquisitions

In September 2011, Tyco announced that it would split into three companies, ADT being one of the three. On October 1, 2012, ADT debuted as an independent public company and began trading on the New York Stock Exchange. In 2014, it acquired the Canadian company Reliance Protectron Security Services from Reliance Home Comfort.

In February 2016, Apollo Global Management acquired ADT for nearly $7 billion and merged it with another home security firm, Protection 1. The purchase price represented a premium of approximately 56 percent over ADT's closing share price on February 12, 2016, and when combined with Protection 1 represented an aggregate transaction value of approximately $15 billion.

In October 2019, Telus Corporation purchased all of ADT's Canadian assets for $700 million. By September 2020, Telus had renamed ADT's Canadian assets to Telus SmartHome Security.

In November 2021, ADT announced an agreement to acquire Sunpro Solar, a residential rooftop solar power contractor, for $160 million in cash plus approximately 77.8 million shares of ADT common stock, implying a total enterprise value of approximately $825 million. The company was rebranded as "ADT Solar" and operates as a wholly owned subsidiary of ADT.

Operations
As of March 2019, ADT had nine monitoring centers and a network of more than 17,000 professionals, serving 6 million customers in over 200 locations throughout the United States.

References

External links
 
 

Apollo Global Management companies
Companies based in Boca Raton, Florida
American companies established in 1874
Technology companies established in 1874
Companies listed on the New York Stock Exchange
Fire detection and alarm companies
Security companies of the United States
1874 establishments in the United States
2016 mergers and acquisitions
2018 initial public offerings
Corporate spin-offs
Telegraph companies of the United States